Bernardino de Almansa Carrión (July 6, 1579 – September 26, 1633) was a Roman Catholic prelate who served as the Archbishop of Santafé en Nueva Granada (1631–1633) and Archbishop of Santo Domingo (1629–1631).

Biography
Bernardino de Almansa Carrión was born in Lima, Peru. On September 17, 1629, he was appointed by the King of Spain and confirmed by Urban VIII as Archbishop of Santo Domingo. In December 1619, he was consecrated bishop by Juan Bravo Lagunas, Bishop of Ugento. On November 13, 1628, he was selected by the King of Spain and confirmed by Pope Urban VIII as Archbishop of Santafé en Nueva Granada. He served as Archbishop of Santafé en Nueva Granada until his death on September 26, 1633. While bishop, he was the principal Consecrator of Luis Córdoba Ronquillo, Bishop of Cartagena.

References

External links and additional sources
 (for Chronology of Bishops) 
 (for Chronology of Bishops) 
 (for Chronology of Bishops) 
 (for Chronology of Bishops) 

1579 births
1633 deaths
Bishops appointed by Pope Urban VIII
Bishops appointed by Pope Paul V
Peruvian emigrants to Colombia
17th-century Roman Catholic archbishops in the Dominican Republic
Roman Catholic archbishops of Bogotá
17th-century Roman Catholic archbishops in New Granada
Roman Catholic archbishops of Santo Domingo